Calopteryx exul (glittering demoiselle) is an endangered species of damselfly in the family Calopterygidae. It is found in Algeria, Morocco, and Tunisia. The largest populations found were located in Northeast Algeria. Its natural habitat is along rivers that have fast flowing water, which are threatened by pollution. 

This is a large damselfly with a total length of up to 50 mm. Unlike most other Calopteryx damselflies, the wings are unbanded in both sexes although the male has metallic venation that produce a distinctive blue flash on each wing beat when the insect is flying in the sun. The males in this species tend to be territorial and when the females lay their eggs in patches of plants the males guard the plants. This species is known for having a partial bivoltine life cycle.

References

 

Calopterygidae
Odonata of Africa
Insects of North Africa
Insects described in 1853
Taxa named by Edmond de Sélys Longchamps
Taxonomy articles created by Polbot